Hydriomena manzanita is a species of geometrid moth in the family Geometridae. It is found in North America.

The MONA or Hodges number for Hydriomena manzanita is 7277.

References

Further reading

External links

 

Hydriomena
Articles created by Qbugbot
Moths described in 1906